Bullitt County is a county located in the north central portion of the U.S. state of Kentucky. As of the 2020 census, the population was 82,217. Its county seat is Shepherdsville. The county was founded in 1796. Located just south of the city of Louisville, Bullitt County is included in the Louisville/Jefferson County, KY-IN Metropolitan Statistical Area, commonly known as Kentuckiana. The western fifth of the county (62 sq. miles/) is part of the United States Army post of Fort Knox and is reserved for military training.

History
The first inhabitants of the land that would become Bullitt County were the Paleo-Indians who entered North America approximately 11,500 to 10,000 years BP. These people, whose ancestors can be traced back to Eastern and Central Asia, were nomadic. They were hunters and gatherers whose remains have been discovered near the area's mineral springs or salt licks, where big game such as the mammoth, bison and ground sloth once gathered. Native Americans were their descendants, including the Shawnee people, who probably considered this region part of their homeland and certainly valued it as a hunting ground.

Both France and Britain had traders and colonists who encountered the Shawnee. European colonization of the Americas led to competing claims between those nations to the lands west of the Appalachians and east of the Mississippi River. After suffering defeat by Great Britain in the Seven Years' War (known as the French and Indian War in its North American front), France ceded control in 1763 of its claimed territories.

For thousands of years before the county's formation, nutrient-rich salt licks attracted large herds of bison and other game to the area. Native American tribes made it their hunting grounds, as did the 18th century longhunter. In 1773, after the French and Indian War, the Virginia governor sent Captain Thomas Bullitt (uncle to Alexander Scott Bullitt) into the area to survey for land grants. The most historic of the county's salt licks, Bullitt's Lick, is named after him. As the Revolutionary War led to widespread salt shortages, the Lick became the site of Kentucky's first industry, attracting many settlers to the area.

Colonial veterans of the war were promised land in what was later called Kentucky. Bullitt's Lick became an important saltwork to the region; its salt was harvested and sent by pack train and flatboat as far off as Illinois to the west. The Bullitt's Lick saltwork was Kentucky's first industry and in production until around 1830. By that time, the steamboat and importing of salt brought access to less expensive sources.

The first settlement of the area was also the first station on the Wilderness Road between Harrodsburg and the Falls of the Ohio. It was a fort called Brashear's Station or the Salt River Garrison, built in 1779 at the mouth of Floyd's Fork. Most of the county was settled after the American Revolutionary War. Shepherdsville, named after Adam Shepherd, a prosperous business man who purchased the land near the Falls of Salt River in 1793, is the oldest town and became the county seat.

In December 1796 the county of Bullitt, named after Thomas Bullitt's nephew and Kentucky's first Lieutenant Governor Alexander Scott Bullitt, was organized from land taken from Jefferson and Nelson counties through an act approved on December 13, 1796, by the Kentucky General Assembly. In 1811, the northwestern area of the county expanded to include land given by Jefferson County. In 1824, an eastern area of the county was given to help form Spencer County.

Geography
The county is located in the far western Bluegrass region known as the Knobs.

Adjacent counties
 Jefferson County – (north)
 Spencer County – (east)
 Nelson County – (southeast)
 Hardin County – (southwest)

Demographics

As of the census of 2000, there were 61,236 people, 22,171 households, and 17,736 families residing in the county. The racial makeup of the county was 98.07% White, 0.38% Black or African American, 0.34% Native American, 0.27% Asian, 0.01% Pacific Islander, 0.16% from other races, and 0.77% from two or more races.  0.63% of the population were Hispanics or Latinos of any race.

There were 22,171 households, out of which 39.00% had children under the age of 18 living with them, 65.40% were married couples living together, 10.40% had a female householder with no husband present, and 20.00% were non-families. 16.40% of all households were made up of individuals, and 5.40% had someone living alone who was 65 years of age or older.  The average household size was 2.75 and the average family size was 3.07.

In the county, the population was spread out, with 27.20% under the age of 18, 8.60% from 18 to 24, 32.70% from 25 to 44, 23.70% from 45 to 64, and 7.80% who were 65 years of age or older.  The median age was 34 years. For every 100 females, there were 98.90 males.  For every 100 females age 18 and over, there were 97.20 males. It can be noted in the chart, the population surge in the 1970s.  The few years of forced school racial integration in adjoining Jefferson County, known locally as 'bussing', had many with school age children relocating to Bullitt County in order to prevent their children from being 'bussed'.

The median income for a household in the county was $50,058 (2005), and the median income for a family was $49,481. Males had a median income of $35,851 versus $24,098 for females. The per capita income for the county was $18,339.  About 6.20% of families and 7.90% of the population were below the poverty line, including 11.40% of those under age 18 and 7.60% of those age 65 or over.

Law and government

Political Culture

Public safety

There are several police agencies in Bullitt County. The primary law enforcement agency in the county is the Bullitt County Sheriff. The Sheriff's Office is an elected position and is staffed by 34 deputy sheriffs, and four office staff. There are also 9 deputies and court certified security officers who provide courthouse security. The Sheriff's Office provides patrol, crime prevention, criminal investigation; and all other police related functions in the county. The primary areas for the sheriff's patrol division are the unincorporated areas in Bullitt County they also provide backup for the various city police agencies. Since 1989 the Sheriff's Office has been contracted by the County Fiscal Court to provide the county police force to the citizens of Bullitt County after the County Police Department was folded. The County Sheriff's Office has deputies assigned to the drug task force, arson task force, accident reconstruction team, rapid response team, technical operations, ATV squad, boat patrol, hostage negotiations, and an incident command team.

Fire protection is provided by both Kentucky Chapter 75 and 95 Districts and Departments. Zoneton Fire Protection District, Mt Washington Fire District, and the Shepherdsville Fire Department are currently staffed with a 24-hour professional firefighting staff. Nichols, Southeast Bullitt, and Lebanon Junction are all volunteer-based.

 Mt Washington Fire District
 Nichols Fire District
 Southeast Bullitt Fire Department
 Shepherdsville Fire Department
 Lebanon Junction Fire Department

The Bullitt County Emergency Medical Service (BCEMS) provides emergency medical care and transport in Bullitt County.

Mount Washington Fire and EMS was founded in 2021 and provides EMS services to the Mount Washington Fire Protection District. They staff two ALS ambulances 24/7. They also provide mutual aid to the remainder of Bullitt County.

Economy

Bullitt County residents have easy access to major job centers such as Elizabethtown, Fort Knox, and Louisville.

Education
Bullitt County is served by Bullitt County Public Schools,  except for parts in Fort Knox, which are served by the Department of Defense Education Activity (DoDEA).

There are six county middle schools:
 Bernheim Middle School
 Bullitt Lick Middle School
 Eastside Middle School
 Hebron Middle School
 Mount Washington Middle School
 Zoneton Middle School

There are four county high schools:
 Bullitt Central High School, located in Shepherdsville, opened in 1970
 Bullitt East High School, located in Mount Washington
 North Bullitt High School, located in Hebron Estates (served by the Shepherdsville post office)
 Riverview High School (formerly 3 different schools)

Fort Knox Middle High School is the high school for Fort Knox.

Communities

Cities

 Fox Chase
 Hebron Estates
 Hillview
 Hunters Hollow
 Lebanon Junction
 Mount Washington
 Pioneer Village
 Shepherdsville (county seat)

Census-designated place
 Brooks

Other unincorporated communities
 Brownington
 Clermont
 Solitude
Zoneton

Although large-scale residential development has not made its way south of Shepherdsville, the growth is apparent in and around that town and in Mount Washington, as well as points north along I-65 towards Hillview. Both Shepherdsville and Mount Washington have stretched their boundaries such that they are nearly touching each other. The  stretch of Kentucky 44 that connects the two towns has homes through nearly the entire expanse.

See also

 National Register of Historic Places listings in Bullitt County, Kentucky

References

External links
 Bernheim Arboretum and Research Forest
 Bullitt County government and commerce website
 Bullitt County History Museum
 Bullitt County Attractions

 
1796 establishments in Kentucky
 
Kentucky counties
Louisville metropolitan area
Populated places established in 1796